Rafael Macedo (born 15 September 1994) is a Brazilian judoka.

He won a medal at the 2019 World Judo Championships.

He represented Brazil at the 2020 Summer Olympics.

References

External links

 

1994 births
Living people
Brazilian male judoka
Judoka at the 2020 Summer Olympics
Olympic judoka of Brazil
Sportspeople from São Paulo
21st-century Brazilian people
20th-century Brazilian people